Peak Rail is a preserved railway in Derbyshire, England, which operates a steam and heritage diesel service for tourists and visitors to both the Peak District and the Derbyshire Dales.

The preserved railway line is over 3½ miles (5.6 km) in length and, operates train services from Matlock station (shared with Derwent Valley Line services from Derby via Ambergate) via the site of Matlock Riverside and Darley Dale to Rowsley South.

Peak Rail intends to extend its operational services northward to  when resources allow, extending to a total of 4¼ miles (6.8 km). Beyond Bakewell, the railway trackbed is used by the Monsal Trail.



History

First preservation attempts with the Buxton Steam Centre

In 1975, the Peak Railway Preservation Society was established and opened a site at the now-closed Buxton Steam Centre with restoration facilities and a 300-yard operating line. Proposals were put forward to extend the operating line onto the single track freight line towards Peak Forest, but were not met with success. However a bridge was purchased and installed over Charles Street to reconnect to British Rail's Ashwood Dale route. The bridge was never used as the whole site was sold to Buxton Water who built a factory shortly after Peak Rail moved to Darley Dale using funds from the sale. The factory was demolished in 2011 and the site is vacant again and so available should Peak Rail ever reach Buxton. 

The BBC reported in 2014 that the station site was proposed for redevelopment.

The Buxton Advertiser reported in June 2019 that Peak Rail intended to reoccupy the Buxton site and start a new Buxton Branch within two months with the first priority being to clear the site. The Peak Rail Association news quotes the support of the local MP however the builder of a new development is causing difficulties with access.

Closure of the Buxton Steam Centre and relocation to Darley Dale 

In 1997, the line was extended within a half-mile south of the Derbyshire village of Rowsley itself. A new station was constructed next to the site of the former loco shed at Rowsley South. The station was capable of holding long incoming charter trains and had a car park to accommodate a large number of cars and other vehicles. The station at Rowsley South has also been used for local charity events and cycle races, as well as steam and vintage vehicle rallies. 
With its location on the edge of the Peak District, the railway joins other attractions in the area, including Bakewell, Haddon Hall, Chatsworth House, the Rowsley shopping village, the village of Rowsley and the Cauldwell's Mill museum.

Extension to Matlock (Network Rail) station
After the construction of the Matlock by-pass, and the new Sainsburys supermarket in the former Cawdor Quarry, a new track alignment and track layout was installed between Matlock Riverside and Matlock (Network Rail) station to provide a new connection to the national network.

Discussions regarding access to the Matlock down platform have resulted in an agreed 50-year lease, including the re-connection of the Network Rail and Peak Rail metals. The rails were originally disconnected due to a rearrangement of Network Rail track as a part of other redevelopments in the area south of the present Matlock Riverside station. The extension to Matlock re-opened on 2 July 2011.

Future developments

In 2004, Derbyshire County Council published a study which concluded that reopening the former line for a local service was technically feasible and that the track bed should remain clear of development, but it was not an economic possibility in the near future.

Expansion towards Bakewell
Phase 1 would restore and re-lay track to the site of Rowsley station in Rowsley itself.
Phase 2 would be reinstating a bridge over the A6 road joining up to Rowsley viaduct, along with restoration of both the viaduct and trackbed as far as a proposed Haddon Halt.
Phase 3 would then be restoring both the old Haddon Tunnel and Coombes Road viaduct to former use before relaying track into the old station site and restoring the site to its former use.

Negotiations for the lease of the mile of trackbed to the north have resulted in the offer of a 99-year lease, from Rowsley South to Rowsley village. However, the extension is dependent on the required finance being raised or bequeathed.

Monsal Trail
Derbyshire County Council and the Peak Planning Board supported a scheme to develop the trackbed from Bakewell to Blackwell Mill as a cycle track, the Monsal Trail. With a stated aim to extend to Rowsley as part of the White Peak Loop Trail, the plans make no mention of the proposed railway extension beyond Rowsley village toward Bakewell.

Special events 
The railway operates special events as well as the normal timetabled services. These include "Santa Specials" for children and families, and the "Warring Forties" event, with battle re-enactments of World War Two skirmishes involving military vehicles and re-enactors on the site; Diesel Galas; and local music festivals.

A restaurant service called "The Palatine" operates on given days throughout the season, whilst at Darley Dale there is a museum of the line's local history.

Operating groups at the railway 

Several railway preservation groups are based at the railway, often working in support of and in co-operation with Peak Rail. These include:

The Heritage Shunters Trust, which has a large collection of former British Railways and private company shunters.
The now defunct Derbyshire Dales Narrow Gauge Railway, which operated narrow gauge trains over a short running line by the picnic ground at Rowsley. The track was lifted and stock sold between 2018 and 2019.
The LMS Carriage Association, which restore examples of L.M.S and other coaching stock.
The Renown Repulse Locomotive Group, responsible for the restoration of two former British Rail Class 50 locomotives.
Andrew Briddon, who has several of his locomotives based upon the railway.
Waterman Railway Heritage Trust which is setting up an engineering business at Rowsley to include apprenticeships
Other locomotive and stock owners who are restoring wagons and stock upon the line

For further details see .

Motive power

Steam locomotives

Operational
 GWR 4575 Class  No. 5553, built in 1928. Owned by Pete Waterman. Moved in 2015 from Crewe Heritage Centre. Returned to service December 2021. Currently painted in BR unlined black with early emblem.

Undergoing overhaul
 GWR 4575 Class  No. 4588, built in 1927. Formerly based at the Dartmouth Steam Railway, she was moved to Tyseley Locomotive Works in 2015, and normally carried the name "Trojan", and is being overhauled at Tyseley prior to moving to Peak Rail.
 Hunslet Austerity 0-6-0ST RSH  No. 7136, built in 1944. (Carries No. 68013 "Royal Pioneer". Previously No.WD150)

Stored 
 GWR 5205 Class  No. 5224, built in 1924. Owned by Pete Waterman. Moved in 2015 from Crewe Heritage Centre and will be overhauled on site.
 GWR 5600 Class  No. 6634, built in 1928. Owned by Pete Waterman. Moved in 2017 from the Severn Valley Railway following its restoration from scrapyard condition never commencing, is due to be restored to working order.

Diesel locomotives

Operational
 BR  Class 01 no. D2953.  BR Green. Built in 1956. (Heritage Shunters Trust owned)
 BR  Class 02 no. D2854. BR Green. Built in 1960.  (Heritage Shunters Trust owned)
 BR  Class 03 no. 03099. BR Blue. Built in 1960.  (Heritage Shunters Trust owned)
 BR  Class 03 no. 03113. BR Blue. Built in 1960.  (Heritage Shunters Trust owned)
 BR  Class 03 no. D2139. BR Green. Built in 1960.  (Heritage Shunters Trust owned)
 BR  Class 04 no. D2284. BR Green. Built in 1960.  (Heritage Shunters Trust owned)
 BR  Class 07 no. 07001. BR Blue. Built in 1962.
 BR  Class 08 no. 08016. BR Blue. Built in 1953.
 BR  Class 09 no. 09001. EWS Red. Built in 1959.
 BR Bo-Bo Class 25 no. D7659. BR Two-Tone Green (Yellow Warning Panels). Built in 1966. In use regularly on passenger trains.
 BR 1Co-Co1 Class 44 no. D8 "Penyghent". BR Green. Built in 1959. In use regularly on passenger trains.
 BR  Class 97/6 no. 97654. Built in 1959.
 Thomas Hill Vanguard  "Charlie" no. 265V regular works train loco. Built in 1975.
 Thomas Hill Vanguard  "Cheedale" no. 284V. Built in 1979.
 Drewry/Vulcan Foundry  no. WD72229. Built in 1945.
 Hudswell Clarke  "Ashdown" no. D1186. Built in 1959.
 Yorkshire Engine Co  "James" no. 2675. Built in 1961.

Undergoing overhaul/restoration
 BR  Class 04 no. D2205. Built in 1953.
 BR  Class 06 no. 06003. BR Blue. Built in 1959.
 BR  Class 14 no. D9525. BR Green. Built in 1965.
 BR Co-Co Class 37 no. 37152. BR Railfreight livery. Built in 1963.
 BR Co-Co Class 50 no. 50030 Repulse BR large logo Blue. Built in 1968.
 Yorkshire Engine Co  no. 2940 of 1965 "Libby"

Stored
 BR  Class 02 no. D2866. BR Blue. Built in 1961.
 BR  Class 02 no. D2868. BR Green. Built in 1961.
 BR  Class 03 no. 03027. BR Blue. Built in 1958.
 BR  Class 03 no. 03180. BR Blue. Built in 1962.
 BR  Class 03 no. D2199. BR Green. Built in 1961.
 BR  Class 04 no. D2229. BR Black. Built in 1955.
 BR  Class 04 no. D2272. BR Green. Built in 1958.
 BR  Class 04 no. D2284. BR Green. Built in 1960.
 BR  Class 04 no. D2337. BR Green. Built in 1956.
 BR  Class 05 no. D2587. BR Green. Built in 1959.
 BR  Class 08 no. D3000. BR Black. Built in 1952.
 BR  Class 14 no. D9500. BR Green. Built in 1964.
 BR Co-Co Class 50 no. 50029 Renown BR Large Logo Blue. Built in 1968.
 North British  27932 of 1959
 North British  27097 of 1953 (oldest s.g. diesel hydraulic in the UK)
 Brush Traction  BT803 of 1979 (formerly with Tyne & Wear Metro and Channel Tunnel construction)
 Yorkshire  (2679 of 1961)

Diesel Multiple Units

Undergoing overhaul/restoration
 BR Class 117 nos. 51354 and 51396 Network SouthEast livery. Built in 1959.

Former Residents

Steam
Note that the locations given may not be current as locomotives move between railways from time to time.
 Hunslet 14" Saddle Tank 0-6-0ST Brookes No. 1 built in 1943. Now operational at the Middleton Railway.
 Hunslet Austerity 0-6-0ST No. 3883 built in 1944. (previous number WD 168 Lord Phil)
 GWR 4073 Class 4-6-0 no 7027 Thornbury Castle. Undergoing restoration from scrapyard condition at the Great Central Railway.
 LMS Stanier 8F Class 2-8-0 no 48624. Operational at the Great Central Railway, was originally painted in unauthentic LMS Crimson lake.

Diesel
 MetroVick Co-Bo D5705, the sole remaining member of Class 28, was preserved from Swindon Works in 1980, stored at Darley Dale/Matlock Bath Goods Shed for many years before removal to Bury on the East Lancashire Railway by 1998 for completion.
 25265 (7615) Harlech Castle used on passengers trains in the 1990s. Now at Nemesis Rail (stored).

Signalling on the railway 

There are four signal boxes on the route. Two boxes control the only two level crossings on the old Midland Railway main line route from Manchester to London St Pancras. The crossings are both in the Darley Dale area on the Peak Rail line. The third signal box at Rowsley is being commissioned to control the sidings and be a public viewing exhibit. This is the former Bamford signal cabin from the Hope Valley. There are plans at Rowsley South railway station for refurbishment and future operational use. The fourth cabin at Riverside came from Luffenham. It controls the Matlock connection to the national network.

Matlock Riverside: an original British Rail cabin, formerly located at Luffenham junction. The restored cabin is mounted on a non prototypical stone-block base with an internal staircase to protect the box from vandalism, required due to its isolated location. The 19-lever frame was recovered from Glendon North Junction near Kettering. Mechanical interlocking allows the signals exiting and entering the loop via the Darley Dale end to be cleared in opposing directions when the cabin is switched out via the King locking lever.
Darley Dale Crossing: controls the section from Darley Dale to Matlock Riverside under the one train staff key, as well as the other gated level crossing at Station Road. Based on an L.M.S. ground level design, it was erected in 2007 to replace the older Midland style replica cabin which had become life-expired.

Darley Dale station: the passing loop at Darley Dale is worked using the Absolute Block method, with the signal box at the other end releasing the signal of the adjacent signal box to allow trains to enter the applicable up or down loop line. Due to the small length of the loop all signals are Home Starter combined signals, rather than the traditional separate distant, home and starter arrangements.

Church Lane Crossing: controls the section from Darley Dale to Rowsley South under the electric key token block method, as well as the traditionally gated level crossing at Churchtown. Originally this signal box came from Gorsey Bank level crossing on the nearby Wirksworth branch. The signals here are Midland Railway lower quadrant examples on wooden posts dating from 1927. The signal box operates the first preserved example of a "Josslock" motor point, an electro-hydraulically worked electro-pneumatic point machine, whereby a standard electro-pneumatic point is driven by a hydraulic power pack.

Rowsley South: The Cabin was originally located at  before it was moved to the up platform at Darley Dale initially, though it was never commissioned. Eventually it was moved to Rowsley in January 2014, whereafter restoration began. It will be used to control the loco shed sidings and yard exits as a shunt frame using a unique now in the UK, though still widely used in Europe, double wire driven point operation using the ex Barrow Hill sidings turnover style lever frame kindly donated by the National Railway Museum and point operating gear which has now been installed at Rowsley.

Two train running
In late February 2007, the railway's 'Two-Train Running' project was completed and approved by HM Railway Inspectorate. Each section of the railway is worked by a train staff, each with a key to operate the ground frames and electrical signal releases at the signal boxes and the ground frames at Rowsley South, Rowsley North, Darley South Yard sidings and Matlock Riverside.

Darley Dale footbridge 
In mid-2009, the original ex-Midland Railway Darley Dale footbridge was purchased from the Midland Railway - Butterley with an aim towards restoration and eventual repositioning at its original location at Darley Dale. Part of this project requires the removal of the unused signal box structure to facilitate the erection of the footbridge. Fundraising for this project began in late 2009 and continues.

See also 
 Manchester, Buxton, Matlock and Midlands Junction Railway
 Monsal Trail

References

External links 

 The Peak Rail website
 Today's Railways February 2007 article on Peak Rail, by kind permission of Platform 5 Publishing
 The Peak Rail Volunteering website 
 Peak Rail's Signalling Department website
 Friends of the Derwent Valley Line
 County Council Feasibility Study Derbyshire County Council (2004) Derby to Manchester Railway Matlock to Buxton / Chinley Link Study. Main Report, Volume 1A: Version: Final. This report also has detailed plans of the line.
 The Andrew Briddon loco collection
 Unique tandem locos saved YouTube. Video shows the process of loading and carrying away half of the Ruston & Hornsby 165DE 0-4-0s 421439 and 423658 at the Scottish Railway Preservation Society for delivery to Peak Rail in September 2020.

Heritage railways in Derbyshire
Tourist attractions of the Peak District